Chiara Ondoli (born 12 October 1995) is an Italian rower. She competed in the 2020 Summer Olympics, in Double sculls.

References

External links
 Washington Huskies bio

1995 births
Living people
Rowers at the 2020 Summer Olympics
Italian female rowers
Olympic rowers of Italy
Washington Huskies women's rowers
People from Cittiglio
Sportspeople from the Province of Varese